Marsh fleabane might be:

Senecio congestus or Senecio palustris or Cineraria palustris or Tephroseris palustris or Othonna palustris
Pluchea odorata (Salt-marsh fleabane)
Pluchea camphorata or Pluchea purpurascens

References